Eugene Philip Howrey (December 1, 1937 – June 17, 2011) was an American economist. He taught at the University of Michigan until 2005.

Born in Geneva, Illinois, Howrey was raised in Iowa, where he attended Fairfield High School and later Drake University. He earned his Ph.D. from the University of North Carolina at Chapel Hill.

Howrey died in a bicycle accident near Boulder, Colorado, in 2011.

Selected publications

References 

1937 births
2011 deaths
Economists from Illinois
Drake University alumni
University of North Carolina at Chapel Hill alumni
University of Michigan faculty
People from Geneva, Illinois